Bob Bicknell (born November 13, 1969) is an American football coach and former player who is the senior offensive assistant for the New Orleans Saints of the National Football League (NFL). He was most recently the wide receivers coach for the Cincinnati Bengals of the National Football League (NFL), a position he has held since January 2018. Bicknell is the son of former Boston College head coach Jack Bicknell and the younger brother of Jack Bicknell, Jr., the current assistant offensive line coach for North Carolina.

Playing career
Bicknell played college football at Boston College, where he was a two-year letterman at tight end from 1989 to 1990.

Coaching career

Boston College
Bicknell began his coaching career at his alma mater Boston College where he would go in to coach safeties in 1993, running backs in 1994 and linebackers in 1995–1997.

NFL Europe
Bicknell joined the pro ranks in 1998 as the defensive line coach with the Frankfurt Galaxy of NFL Europe. The following season, he switched to the offensive side of the ball to coach the offensive line. During his two-year tenure in Frankfurt, the Galaxy reached the World Bowl final twice, winning the championship in 1999. During his time in Europe, Bicknell won three consecutive World Bowls as part of the coaching staff of the Frankfurt Galaxy 1999 and the Berlin Thunder 2000–2001. He was the offensive coordinator/offensive line coach for Berlin from 2001 to 2003 and followed it with two years in the same position for the Cologne Centurions.

Temple
Bicknell served as the offensive line coach at Temple University in 2006.

Kansas City Chiefs
Bicknell began coaching in the NFL with the Kansas City Chiefs in  his initially served as the team's assistant offensive line coach before being promoted the next year to offensive line coach. In  he was moved once more, then moving to coach tight ends.

Buffalo Bills
Bicknell was named tight ends coach for the Buffalo Bills on January 27, 2010. Following the departure of former wide receivers coach Stan Hixon to join Penn State's staff under new coach Bill O'Brien, Bicknell was named the Bills wide receivers coach. He was dismissed, along with the entire Bills coaching staff, on December 31, 2012.

Philadelphia Eagles
Bicknell spent - as the Philadelphia Eagles’s wide receivers coach in under Chip Kelly. During his tenure with the Eagles', their offense set franchise records in points, touchdowns, passing yards, completions and completion percentage.

San Francisco 49ers
In  Bicknell followed Kelly to the 49ers after being fired from the Eagles.

Baylor Bears
Bicknell spent 2017 at Baylor, as a part of Matt Rhule's staff  where he served as the team's wide receivers coach. With his help then sophomore Denzel Mims became one of only six WRs from Power Five schools to top 1000 yards.

Cincinnati Bengals
Bicknell was hired by the Cincinnati Bengals as their wide receivers coach on January 8, 2018.

Bicknell missed the team's weeks 10 and 11 games in 2020 against the Pittsburgh Steelers and Washington Football Team due to COVID-19 pandemic protocols.

References

External links
 Buffalo Bills bio
 Local presences on NFL coaching staffs
 Bicknell at home on the sidelines

1969 births
Living people
American football tight ends
Baylor Bears football coaches
Berlin Thunder coaches
Boston College Eagles football players
Boston University Terriers football coaches
Buffalo Bills coaches
Cincinnati Bengals coaches
Coaches of American football from Massachusetts
Cologne Centurions (NFL Europe) coaches
Frankfurt Galaxy coaches
Kansas City Chiefs coaches
People from Holliston, Massachusetts
Philadelphia Eagles coaches
San Francisco 49ers coaches
Sportspeople from Middlesex County, Massachusetts
Temple Owls football coaches
New Orleans Saints coaches